Teresa Lo is an American author, blogger, television personality, and screenwriter. Her young adult novel, Hell's Game, was an Amazon bestseller in 2013; and her Asian-American series, The Red Lantern Scandals, received media attention because of its graphic depiction of Asian-American female sexuality. Hyphen Magazine wrote, "The book is not just about sex but about discovering and celebrating one’s independence." In 2013, she was the judge of Hyphen Magazine's first ever erotica writing contest.
Lo has a Masters in Fine Arts in Writing for Screen and Television from the University of Southern California. She has a bachelor's degree in History from the University of Kansas, and KU named her a Woman of Distinction, one of the highest honors the university bestows upon female alumni or students.

In 2012, Lo was a cast member on the film and television review show Just Seen It, which airs on PBS and Hulu.

In 2015, she joined Marc Haimes' production company, Haimes Productions, as the Head of Development.

Selected works
 Realities: a Collection of Short Stories
 The Other Side: a Collection of Short Stories
 Hell's Game
 The Red Lantern Scandals

References 

Year of birth missing (living people)
Living people
Women erotica writers
American erotica writers
American writers of Asian descent
21st-century American writers
21st-century American women writers
University of Kansas alumni
USC School of Cinematic Arts alumni
American young adult novelists